Reverend Luther Tracy Townsend (September 27, 1838 - 1922) was a professor at Boston University and an author of theological and historical works.

Biography
He was born on September 27, 1838 in Orono, Maine, to Luther K. Townsend and Mary True Call. His father died on November 16, 1839, and his mother took the family to New Hampshire. He started work at the Boston, Concord and Montreal Railroad in 1850. He infrequently attended the New Hampshire Conference Seminary, now known as the Tilton School. He graduated from Dartmouth College with an A.B. in 1859. He then attended Andover Theological Seminary and graduated in 1862. He enlisted as a private in the 16th New Hampshire Volunteer Infantry in 1862 during the American Civil War. He was ordained by the Methodist church, in 1864. On September 27, 1865, he married Laura C. Huckins, the daughter of David T. Huckins and Sarah F. White of Watertown, Massachusetts.

Townsend was a Christian creationist. He attacked evolution and defended the first chapters of Genesis in his books Evolution or Creation (1896), Adam and Eve (1904) and Collapse of Evolution (1905). He was a supporter of William Menzies Alexander's research on demonic possession.

Publications

Credo, and True and Pretended Christianity (1869)
Sword and Garment (1871)
God-Man (1872)
Lost Forever, and Outlines of Theology (1873)
Arena and Throne (1874)
The Chinese Problem (1876)
The Supernatural Factor in Revivals (1877)
The Intermediate World (1878)
Elements of General and Christian Theology (1879)
Fate of Republics, and Studies in Poetry and Prose (1880)
Art of Speech (2 volumes, 1880-1881)
Studies in Eloquence and Logic and Mosaic Record and Modern Science (1881)
Bible Theology and Modern Thought (1883)
Faith-Work, Christian Science and other Cures (1885)
Hand-Book upon Church Trials, and the Bible and other Ancient Literature (1885)
Pulpit and Rhetoric (1886)
New Hampshire Volunteers (1896)
History of the Sixteenth Regiment (1897)
Story of Jonah in the Light of Higher Criticism (1897)
Twelve discourses of the Credo series (1898)
Evolution or Creation (1896)
Anastasis (1900)
Collapse of Evolution (1905)
The Stars Not Inhabited: Scientific and Biblical Points of View (1914)

References

1838 births
1922 deaths
American Christian writers
Dartmouth College alumni
Boston University faculty
Critics of Christian Science
American Christian creationists
American Methodist clergy
Tilton School alumni